The Fabulous Shirley Bassey is the third studio album by Welsh singer Shirley Bassey, and her first for Columbia Records. It was recorded with Geoff Love and his orchestra, and peaked at #12 in the UK album chart in early 1961. Released in 1959, this was the first studio album from Shirley Bassey with completely new material. Her two previous albums issued on the Philips label were collections of new recordings and previously released material, recorded between 1956 and 1958.

The album was issued in mono and stereo. In 1997 the Dutch company Disky Records issued a 2-CD set entitled Original Gold, four tracks from the album "A Foggy Day in London Town", "April In Paris", "The Man That Got Away" and "They Can't Take that Away from Me" were included, all were previously unavailable on CD at this time. EMI at Abbey Road, London provided the mono masters, instead of stereo, for this release. Unlike other artists, such as Cliff Richard and the Beatles, EMI has not re-issued any complete Shirley Bassey album in mono on CD. The stereo version of this album was issued on CD in 1999 by EMI.

Track listing
Side One.
 "A Foggy Day in London Town" (George Gershwin, Ira Gershwin) – 3:11
 "I've Got You Under My Skin" (Cole Porter) – 3:33
 "Cry Me a River" (Arthur Hamilton) – 3:28
 "April in Paris" (E. Y. Harburg, Vernon Duke) – 2:55
 "I've Never Been in Love Before" (Frank Loesser) – 3:40
 "The Man That Got Away" (Harold Arlen, Ira Gershwin) – 4:03

Side Two. 
 "'S Wonderful" (George Gershwin, Ira Gershwin) – 2:15
 "I'll Remember April" (Don Raye, Gene de Paul, Patricia Johnston) – 4:07   
 "Easy to Love" (Cole Porter) – 3:03
 "No One Ever Tells You" (Carroll Coates, Hubbard Atwood) – 2:54
 "They Can't Take that Away from Me" (George Gershwin, Ira Gershwin)  – 3:11
 "The Party's Over" (Jule Styne, Adolph Green, Betty Comden) – 3:31

Personnel
 Shirley Bassey – vocal
 Geoff Love – arranger, conductor
 Geoff Love and his Orchestra – orchestra

Charts

References 

Shirley Bassey albums
1959 albums
EMI Records albums
Columbia Records albums
Albums conducted by Geoff Love
Albums arranged by Geoff Love
Albums produced by Norman Newell